The Sony Xperia Z3+ (known as the Sony Xperia Z4 in Japan) is an Android smartphone produced by Sony. Unveiled on April 20, 2015, it is an upgraded version of 2014's Xperia Z3 with improved specifications, a thinner body and Android 5.0 "Lollipop". The phone was awarded for the best European Multimedia Smartphone for the year 2015-2016 by European Imaging and Sound Association.

History 
The device was first unveiled on April 20, 2015 exclusively for release in Japan as the Xperia Z4. On May 26, 2015, Sony announced an international release for the device scheduled for June; for the international release, the device was re-marketed as the Xperia Z3+. On June 16, 2015, Sony announced the Xperia Z4v (E6508), a variant of the Xperia Z3+/Z4 exclusively for Verizon Wireless in the United States. However, on October 5, 2015, Sony and Verizon announced the device had been cancelled, citing stiff competition from other flagships, as well as poor launch timing with the release of its successor, the Xperia Z5.

The Xperia Z4 first went on sale in Japan on June 10, 2015, and the Xperia Z3+ first went on sale in Hong Kong on June 12, 2015.

Specifications 
The Xperia Z3+/Z4 is nearly identical in design to its predecessor, with a metal frame and glass rear, aside from minor differences such as a slimmer and lighter build. The Qualcomm Snapdragon 801 of the Z3 has been replaced by a Snapdragon 810, with support for LTE Cat 6. The Xperia Z3+/Z4 features a  FHD 1080p display with a density of 424 ppi, featuring Sony's "Triluminos" technology, as well as 32GB of internal storage and a non-removable 2930 mAh battery with support for Qualcomm's Quick Charge 2.0 standard.

The Xperia Z4 has several features not found in the Xperia Z3+, such as a 1seg DTV antenna allowing for reception of television channels broadcasting using the ISDB-T standard, as well as an Osaifu-Keitai mobile payment system using Sony FeliCa ICs.

The now-cancelled Xperia Z4v for Verizon was thicker and heavier the Xperia Z3+/Z4 due to the inclusion of Qi/PMA wireless charging. The Xperia Z4v also would have featured a WQHD 1440p touchscreen display as well as the inclusion of Verizon logos on the front and back of the phone.

Design 
The Xperia Z3+/Z4 features an "Omni-Balance" design, somewhat modified from the Xperia Z3 and more reminiscent of that of the Xperia Z2. The Xperia Z3+/Z4 features an exposed micro USB port at the bottom, the first in the Xperia Z series and the second Sony phone overall after the Xperia M4 Aqua to have such a feature. Although the micro USB port is exposed, this does not impact the phone's IP65/68 dust protection, water jet protection and waterproof rating. The Xperia Z3+/Z4 is available in four colors: black, white, copper and aqua green (Ice Green in the UK).

Variants

Xperia Z3+

Xperia Z4

Xperia Z4v (cancelled)

Notes

References 

Android (operating system) devices
Sony smartphones
Mobile phones introduced in 2015
Mobile phones with 4K video recording